Aliabad-e Guneh (also Romanized as ‘Alīābād-e Gūneh) is a village in Mohammadabad Rural District of the Central District of Karaj County, Alborz province, Iran. At the 2006 census, its population was 3,803 in 974 households. At the most recent census in 2016, the population of the village had decreased to 3,256 in 1,015 households; it is the largest village in its rural district.

References 

Karaj County

Populated places in Alborz Province

Populated places in Karaj County